Coelophrys is a genus of fishes in the family Ogcocephalidae, one of the families of anglerfishes. They are distributed in the western Pacific Ocean and the Indian Ocean.

Species
There are currently seven recognized species in this genus:
 Coelophrys arca H. M. Smith & Radcliffe, 1912
 Coelophrys bradburyae Endo & G. Shinohara, 1999
 Coelophrys brevicaudata A. B. Brauer, 1902
 Coelophrys brevipes H. M. Smith & Radcliffe, 1912
 Coelophrys micropa Alcock, 1891
 Coelophrys mollis H. M. Smith & Radcliffe, 1912
 Coelophrys oblonga H. M. Smith & Radcliffe, 1912

References

Ogcocephalidae
Taxa named by August Brauer
Marine fish genera